Mehndi is a 1983 Bollywood drama film, directed by Asit Sen. It stars Vinod Mehra, Bindiya, Raj Babbar. Dialogues were written by V.K. Sharma .

Plot
Mehndi is a drama film on the life of an Indian Army Official, on the battlefield he gets injured and fell in love with a common girl who acts as a nurse at army tents. However after being healthy , he joins a new mission and when he returns to his girlfriend whom he was promised to marry,  he found his love interest was molested and murdered which leaving him heartbroken. His best friend was also missing in war. His life becomes miserable when he find that he  after married a girl who is the lover of his best friend who was missing in war.

Cast
 Raj Babbar
 Vinod Mehra
 Ranjeeta Kaur
 Raj Bothra
 Usha Kiran
 Birbal
 Meena T
 Shakti Kapoor
 Bindiya Goswami
 Madan Puri
 Mohan Choti
 Seema Deo

Soundtrack

External links

References

1983 films
1980s Hindi-language films
Indian drama films